Sharkey is a surname of Irish origin.

Sharkey, Sharky or Sharkies may also refer to:

Places
 Sharkey, Kentucky, United States, an unincorporated community
 Sharkey County, Mississippi, United States

People
 Sharkey Bonano (1904–1972), American jazz trumpeter, band leader and vocalist
 Sharkey McEwen, California-born musician and producer
 Sharkey Ward (born 1943), Canadian Royal Navy officer
 Lewis Brown (rugby league) (born 1986), New Zealand rugby league footballer nicknamed "Sharky"
 Mark Robinson (rugby union, born 1975), New Zealand retired rugby union footballer nicknamed "Sharky"
 George Sweatt (1893–1983), American Negro league baseball player nicknamed "Sharky"
 DJ Sharkey (born 1975), British DJ born Jonathan Kneath
 Bill Sharky, former member of The Barron Knights, a British humorous pop group
 Feargal Sharkey, singer from Northern Ireland, former lead singer of The Undertones
 Kevin Sharkey, artist, former actor, tv presenter and presidential candidate
 Sharky, former member of the Prodigy, an English electronic dance music group
 Sharky P or Sharkie P, a UK garage MC and member of DJ Pied Piper and the Masters of Ceremonies

Fictional characters
 An alias for Saruman, in J. R. R. Tolkien's The Lord of the Rings
 James "Sharky" Harkin, main character of the 2006 play The Seafarer by Irish playwright Conor McPherson
 Sharky, a puppet in Sharky's Friends, an Australian children's television game show
 one of the title characters of Sharky & George, a French and Canadian animated children's television series
 Sharky the Sharkdog, a character in Eek! The Cat, an American-Canadian animated series
 Sharkey, right hand man of Olrik in Blake and Mortimer, Franco-Belgian comics series
 Sharky, mascot of the Sea Life Minnesota Aquarium
 Sharkey, one of the protagonists in the James Bond film Licence to Kill
 Lawyer Sharky, a Disney character from the Donald Duck universe
 S.J. Sharkie, the mascot for the San Jose Sharks

Other uses
 , a destroyer in service between the world wars
 Cronulla-Sutherland Sharks, Australian professional rugby league team nicknamed the "Sharkies"

See also
 Shark (disambiguation)

Lists of people by nickname